Daniel J. "Dan" Burling (born January 11, 1947) was a Republican member of the New York State Assembly representing Assembly District 147, which comprises a number of communities located in Upstate New York, including Allegany County, Genesee County, Livingston County, and Wyoming County. He was formerly the Minority Whip in the Assembly.

Early life and career
Burling was born in Batavia, New York. He graduated from Ilion High School, after which he enlisted in the U.S. Marine Corps (1965–1969), including a tour in Vietnam. A licensed pilot and aircraft mechanic, he was the airport manager at Nellis Airport in Fort Plain in 1972. He graduated from the Empire State Military Academy, receiving a commission as a Second Lieutenant in the U.S. Army Reserve in 1976.

Burling graduated from Herkimer County Community College in 1977, then received a B.S. degree from the University at Buffalo School of Pharmacy in 1980. A registered pharmacist, he owns Burling Drug, Inc., which had a location in Attica (1987–1996) and another in Corfu (1991–present). He also was an intern and staff pharmacist at Genesee Memorial Hospital and a consulting pharmacist at the Genesee County Nursing Home in Batavia.

Political career
Burling was a member of the Genesee County Legislature from 1993 until 1998. He was first elected to the New York State Assembly in 1998. He won the November 2008 general election with 71 percent of the vote and ran uncontested in the November 2010 general election. Burling did not seek reelection in 2012.

Personal life
Burling and his wife Jean reside in the Town of Alexander. They have two children, Mary and David.

References

External links
New York Assembly member website
Daniel Burling official website

1947 births
Living people
Republican Party members of the New York State Assembly
People from Wyoming County, New York
University at Buffalo alumni
People from Batavia, New York
People from Fort Plain, New York
People from Alexander, New York
21st-century American politicians